was a Japanese daimyō of the Edo period, who ruled the Akō Domain following its confiscation from Asano Naganori. Naohiro was the eldest son of Nagai Naotsune,  and assumed family headship after his father's death. Upon the confiscation of the Nasu clan's territory in Shimotsuke Province, Naohiro was transferred there from his previous holdings in Kawachi, and thus became the lord of the Karasuyama Domain. Naohiro was appointed to the offices of jisha-bugyō and sōshaban in 1694, and in the fall of 1701, after the execution of Asano Naganori, he received a 3000 koku increase in stipend, becoming the new lord of Akō, with a territory of 33,000 koku. However, because of the time-consuming nature of his work as jisha-bugyō, the domain's affairs were run by his retainers. Naohiro subsequently became a wakadoshiyori in 1704. He was moved to Iiyama in 1706, and Iwatsuki in 1711; Naohiro died soon after the move, in the summer of 1711. His son Naohira succeeded to the family headship.

Naohiro's grave is at Kōunji Temple, in Nakano City, Tokyo.

|-

|-

|-

References
This article is derived from corresponding content on the Japanese Wikipedia.

1664 births
1711 deaths
Daimyo
Wakadoshiyori